Rüger is a German surname. Notable people with the surname include:

 Sigrid Damm-Rüger (1939-1995), German feminist activist
 Werner Rüger, German luger

See also
 Ruger (surname)

German-language surnames